J.L. Coker Company Building is a historic commercial building located at Hartsville, Darlington County, South Carolina.  It was designed by Charles Coker Wilson and built in 1909–1910.  It is a one-story, 11-bay, brick building with a brick warehouse addition.  The building covers an area of approximately one acre. The façade consists of an arcade whose segmental arches enclose the display bays and entrances. It was built for the company founded by Major James Lide Coker. It is currently the home of the Hartsville YMCA.

It was listed on the National Register of Historic Places in 1983.

References

Commercial buildings on the National Register of Historic Places in South Carolina
Commercial buildings completed in 1910
Buildings and structures in Hartsville, South Carolina
National Register of Historic Places in Darlington County, South Carolina